Frank E. Ratts Generating Station was Indiana’s first electric cooperative power plant, located on the White River near Petersburg in Pike County, Indiana. Ratts Generating Station was rated to produce 250 MW of electricity with two turbine generators that began commercial operation in 1970. It was owned by Hoosier Energy.

On December 29, 2014 Unit 2 of Frank E. Ratts facilities was shut down per consent decree.

Legal Settlement
In July 2010 an agreement was reached between the EPA and Hoosier Energy to reduce emissions that are regulated under the Clean Air Act.  The agreement covers a civil penalty and a commitment to upgrade the air pollution at two power plants in Indiana, Merom Generating Station, and Frank E. Ratts Generating Station.

Per consent decree the Frank E. Ratts station was closed and idled/shut down completely. It was torn down during late 2016 and early 2017 and the site has been graded and seeded.

See also

 List of power stations in Indiana
 Global warming

References

External links
 Ratts Generating Station

1970 establishments in Indiana
2015 disestablishments in Indiana
Energy infrastructure completed in 1970
Buildings and structures demolished in 2016
Buildings and structures demolished in 2017
Buildings and structures in Pike County, Indiana
Coal-fired power stations in Indiana
Demolished power stations in the United States
Former coal-fired power stations in the United States
Former power stations in Indiana